Kwame Addae was a Ghanaian diplomat. He served as Ghana's High Commissioner to Pakistan from 1966 to 1968 and Ghana's Ambassador to Mali from 1974 to 1977. Prior to representing Ghana in Pakistan, he was the head of chancery for the Ghana High Commission to the United Kingdom.

See also
Embassy of Ghana in Bamako

References

Year of birth missing
20th-century Ghanaian politicians
Ambassadors of Ghana to Mali
Ghanaian diplomats
High Commissioners of Ghana to Pakistan